The 2022 FIBA U18 Women's European Championship Division B was the 16th edition of the Division B of the FIBA U18 Women's European Championship, the second tier of the European women's under-18 basketball championship. It was played from 30 July to 7 August 2022 in Sofia, Bulgaria. Slovenia women's national under-18 basketball team won the tournament.

Participating teams

  (15th place, 2019 FIBA U18 Women's European Championship Division A)

  (16th place, 2019 FIBA U18 Women's European Championship Division A)

First round
The draw of the first round was held on 15 February 2022 in Freising, Germany.

In the first round, the teams were drawn into four groups. The first two teams from each group advance to the quarterfinals; the other teams will play in the 9th–18th place classification groups.

Group A

Group B

Group C

Group D

9th–18th place classification

Group E

Group F

17th place match

15th place match

13th place match

11th place match

9th place match

Championship playoffs

Quarterfinals

5th–8th place semifinals

Semifinals

7th place match

5th place match

3rd place match

Final

Final standings

References

External links

2022
2022–23 in European women's basketball
International youth basketball competitions hosted by Bulgaria
Sports competitions in Sofia
FIBA U18
July 2022 sports events in Bulgaria
August 2022 sports events in Bulgaria